The following is a list of massacres that have occurred in Italy and its predecessors (numbers may be approximate): they are divided by the presence of culpability or not.

List parameters 
A massacre is the killing of a large number of people, especially those who are not involved in any fighting or have no way of defending themselves.

The following are the parameters used to create the list:

 Massacres, accidents or natural disasters that occurred in the actual Italian Republic territory, in the nearby sea, or by Italian ships or airplanes around the world (which are considered part of the Italian territory, by the Italian law);
 Massacres, accidents or natural disasters with at least 3 deaths.

List of culpable massacres

Archaic Italy

Roman Italy

Ostrogothic Italy

Medieval Italy

Early Modern Italy

Risorgimento

Kingdom of Italy

Fascist Italy

Second World War

Republic of Italy

List of non-culpable massacres and natural disasters

Roman Italy

Medieval Italy

Modern Italy

XX and XXI centuries 

(**) For the Italian law, all the Italian ships are considered Italian territory.

See also 

 List of accidents and disasters by death toll
 List of lists organized by death toll
 List of maritime disasters in the 20th century
 List of accidents and incidents involving airliners by location

For Italians massacred outside Italy 

 Anti-Italianism
 Anti-Catholicism in the United States (and Know Nothing movement)
 Italian Military Internees
 Foibe massacres
 Massacre of Italians at Aigues-Mortes
 March 14, 1891 New Orleans lynchings
 Sacco and Vanzetti

Citations

References

 
 
 
 Stille, Alexander (1995). Excellent Cadavers. The Mafia and the Death of the First Italian Republic, New York: Vintage 
 

Italy
Massacres
 
Massacres